The Machurucuto raid, also known as the Invasion of Machurucuto, was a battle involving Venezuelan Army and National Guard troops against Cuban trained guerrillas. On 10 May 1967, a dozen guerrillas landed in Venezuela at the beach of Machurucuto. The Army of Venezuela and the National Guard engaged them on the night of 10 May and the battle lasted into 11 May. Two men were captured while the remaining were killed in battle. The guerrillas had completed paramilitary training in Cuba so they could recruit guerrillas in the Venezuelan Andes region to overthrow President Raúl Leoni.

Events

Landing 
On 8 May, twelve guerrillas arrived on the coast of Machurucuto in two rafts. While preparing to land one of the rafts capsized drowning one guerrilla. The rest disembarked on the coast and abandoned their rafts.

Confrontation with the Venezuelan army 
A fisherman spotted the two rafts and notified the armed forces. They discovered and engaged the guerrillas on the evening of 10 May and the battle lasted until the morning of 11 May. In the fighting, ten guerrillas were killed and two captured; Venezuelan casualties are unknown.

Aftermath 
Soon after, the government of President Raúl Leoni held a press conference denouncing Cuban aggression against Venezuela and showing the two captured Cubans, Manuel Gil Castellanos and Pedro Cabrera Torres. Cuba was denounced by Venezuela to the Organization of American States (OAS). Cuba did not acknowledge the action even when the investigation of the AK47s in possession of the guerrillas were identified as weapons sold by Czechoslovakia to Cuba. The government of Venezuela broke all relations with Cuba following the incident and with further relations not occurring until 1974.

See also 

 Operation Gideon (2020)
Cuba–Venezuela relations

Notes

External links 

Battles involving Venezuela
Fidel Castro
Battles involving Cuba
1967 in Cuba
1967 in Venezuela
Cuba–Venezuela relations
Conflicts in 1967